Of Men And Angels: B-Sides is a 2010 EP by The Rocket Summer.  It was released on October 19, 2010. It contain songs that didn't make the cut of The Rocket Summer album Of Men and Angels.

Track listing

References

2010 EPs
The Rocket Summer albums